One Long Year is Todd Rundgren's seventeenth album, released in 2000. It is composed of recordings that were released initially only to subscribers to Rundgren's online PatroNet facility, as well as other miscellany. To promote the album Rundgren performed "I Hate My Frickin' I.S.P." on Late Night with Conan O'Brien.

Track listing
All tracks are written by Todd Rundgren.
"I Hate My Frickin' I.S.P." - 3:47
"Buffalo Grass" - 4:32
"Jerk" - 4:40
"Bang on the Ukulele Daily" (live) - 3:05
"Where Does the Time Go?" - 4:48
"Love of the Common Man" - 3:28
"Mary and the Holy Ghost" - 4:22
"Yer Fast (And I Like It)" - 3:15
"Hit Me Like a Train" - 5:02
"The Surf Talks" - 5:49

Personnel
Todd Rundgren - all vocals and instruments, producer, engineer
 additional performers on "Love of the Common Man"
Ken Emerson - guitar
Jesse Gress - guitar
Kasim Sulton - bass
John Ferenzik - keyboards
Prairie Prince - drums

References

Todd Rundgren albums
2000 albums
Albums produced by Todd Rundgren
Artemis Records albums